Hans Schwarzentruber (25 March 1929 – 23 November 1982) was a Swiss gymnast who competed in the 1952 Summer Olympics and in the 1960 Summer Olympics.

References

1929 births
1982 deaths
Swiss male artistic gymnasts
Olympic gymnasts of Switzerland
Gymnasts at the 1952 Summer Olympics
Gymnasts at the 1960 Summer Olympics
Olympic silver medalists for Switzerland
Olympic medalists in gymnastics
Medalists at the 1952 Summer Olympics
20th-century Swiss people